Joan Jara (born Joan Alison Turner,  England, 1927) is a British-Chilean dancer, activist, and widow of Chilean icon, communist and folksinger Víctor Jara. Since his death, she dedicated herself to perpetuating the memory of him, his work, and his values. She wrote An Unfinished Song: The Life of Victor Jara in 1984, and founded the Víctor Jara Foundation.

Early life and career 

Jara was born in England in 1927. She met Víctor at the University of Chile in 1961: he studied theatre and she gave dance classes in the theatre school. At this time, Jara also danced in the national ballet. When she was recovering from an illness once, Víctor brought her flowers that Jara surmises he stole from the park due to his budget. Jara had a daughter less than a year old at this time from a previous husband, from whom she was separated. The daughter and Víctor were close.

1973 Coup 

Her husband was assassinated in the 1973 coup. He left the morning of the coup to defend the university and was corralled with others into the stadium, which became "a makeshift concentration camp". Jara sought assistance from the British embassy, which was closed. Jara identified his body in the Santiago morgue within a pile of corpses, where his wrists and neck were broken, his abdomen gory, and his body shot with 44 bullets. Before he died, he arranged for a message to be smuggled out of the stadium to his wife, telling her where he had last parked their car and saying that he loved her. He became one of the best-known victims of the coup.

She left Chile in 1973, changed her surname to Jara, and dedicated herself to perpetuating the memory of her husband, his works, and his values. She returned to Chile in 1984 to revive his memory. In an interview, Jara said the Chilean military would not tell her the names of the officers at the stadium where Víctor died. As court cases proceeded, the military underlings outed their officers. Her lawyer added that the Chilean military has a "pact of silence" against providing information to the families of the disappeared, and that the low-level soldiers' testimony was pivotal to their officer identification efforts.

Civil lawsuit 

In 2013, Jara filed a civil lawsuit against a former military officer she charges as responsible for her husband's death, Pedro Barrientos, who has lived in Florida for about 20 years and became an American citizen through marriage. The lawsuit was filed under the Torture Victim Protection Act and the Alien Tort Statute, a federal law that lets American courts try foreign human rights disputes. Barrientos and six others were charged in Jara's murder in December 2012 based on a conscript's corroborated testimony.

References

External links

Documentaries
 British Film Institute documentary film Compañero Víctor Jara of Chile directed by Martin Smith and Stanley Forman in 1974 available in four parts on YouTube.

1927 births
Living people
Chilean activists
Chilean female dancers
British emigrants to Chile
Dancers from London
Naturalized citizens of Chile